FATA University is a public sector university situated in Akhorwal, Tribal Sub-Division Darra Adam Khel, Kohat, Khyber Pakhtunkhwa, Pakistan. The university is run by the Higher Education Department, Government of Khyber Pakhtunkhwa.

History
The university was approved by Pakistan's caretaker Prime Minister Mir Hazar Khan Khoso in May 2013. It is the first-ever university in the Federally Administered Tribal Areas. Classes commenced on October 24, 2016, under the direction of Dr. Mohammad Tahir Shah, former professor of geology at University of Peshawar.

Campus
FATA University is temporarily located within a portion of the Government Degree College Dara Adam Khel on the Indus Valley Highway from Peshawar to Kohat. A new campus is currently under construction in Akhorwal on an area of 58.25 acres. The university plans to open sub-campuses at Khar, Miran Shah, and Parachinar in addition to the current Akhorwal campus.

Academics
The university currently offers courses in management science, mathematics, sociology and also political science.

Corruption allegations
In May 2017, the FATA Students Organization asked the federal government to investigate allegations of corruption and irregularities at FATA university. Student Organization president Zia Afridi and Vice President Dilawar Khan of Shangla reported that the University Finance Officer, Asad Jan, had illegally appointed his relatives to posts intended to be filled by residents of the tribal areas.

See also
University of Peshawar
Universities in Pakistan

References

FATA University
2016 establishments in Pakistan
Educational institutions established in 2016